Events in the year 2022 in Cape Verde.

Incumbents 

 President: José Maria Neves
 Prime Minister: Ulisses Correia e Silva

Events 
Ongoing – COVID-19 pandemic in Cape Verde

 20 JuneIt is announced that Cape Verde will allocate a budget of $85 million to combat the effects of the war in Ukraine, which has caused an increase in the prices of gasoline and food, as 9% of Cape Verdeans are currently facing a food crisis.

Sports 

 2021 Africa Cup of Nations:
 9 JanuaryEthiopia 0–1 Cape Verde
 13 JanuaryCape Verde 0–1 Burkina Faso
 17 JanuaryCape Verde 1–1 Cameroon
 26 JanuaryCape Verde 0–2 Senegal (round of 16 knockout)

References 

 
2020s in Cape Verde
Years of the 21st century in Cape Verde
Cape Verde
Cape Verde